General Assembly (1976–2005) was an American Thoroughbred racehorse. He was bred and raced by the prominent husband-and-wife team of Bertram and Diana Firestone, of Upperville, Virginia. General Assembly was out of the mare Exclusive Dancer, daughter of Native Dancer. His sire was the 1973 U.S. Triple Crown champion Secretariat.

General Assembly was trained by future U.S. Racing Hall of Fame inductee LeRoy Jolley. At age two, the colt won the Hopeful Stakes and the Saratoga Special Stakes; he ran second to Spectacular Bid in both the Champagne Stakes and the Laurel Futurity.

Racing at age three in 1979, in the U.S. Triple Crown series General Assembly ran second in the Kentucky Derby and fifth in the Preakness Stakes to winner Spectacular Bid. In the Belmont Stakes, he finished seventh behind upset winner Coastal. General Assembly won the Vosburgh Stakes and ran second again to Spectacular Bid in the Marlboro Cup Invitational Handicap. He then earned the most important victory of his career with a 15-length win in the Travers Stakes, in which he set a Saratoga track record for the mile and a quarter which stood until 2016.

As a sire

General Assembly was retired to stud duty beginning in 1980 at his owner's breeding operation in County Kildare, Ireland.  In 1986 he returned to the United States to stand in Kentucky; in 1993 was sent to breeders in France, and in 1995 to a German breeding farm. Although General Assembly was never the successful stallion his regal bloodline promised, he sired 31 stakes-race winners. One of his best-known offspring was Steady Flame, who raced at two in Ireland and then was sent to Hong Kong; there he won the Hong Kong Champions & Chater Cup, was a champion sprinter in 1989-91 and champion older miler in 1990 and Presidium.

His stud farm, Gestüt Olympia in Alpen, Germany announced that the 29-year-old General Assembly had been euthanized in March 2005 due to heart and circulatory problems.

Bloodline:  Discovery (1931–1958) was a champion American Thoroughbred racehorse.  Discovery was inducted into the U.S. Racing Hall of Fame in 1969.  The National Museum of Racing and Hall of Fame said that he was "considered one of the greatest horses of the 20th century."  Discovery won 27 races from 1933 to 1936.  As the chart below shows, the pedigree of the champion racehorse General Assembly includes two lines from Discovery.  Discovery was an ancestor of both Secretariat and Exclusive Dancer.  One line goes from Discovery to Miss Disco 1944 to Bold Ruler 1954 to Sire (father), Secretariat 1970.  The other line goes from Discovery to Geisha 1943 to Native Dancer 1950 to Dam (mother), Exclusive Dancer 1967.

Pedigree

References

External links
 Video of General Assembly's 1979 Travers Stakes record-setting win

1976 racehorse births
2005 racehorse deaths
Racehorses bred in Virginia
Racehorses trained in the United States
Horse racing track record setters
Thoroughbred family 10-a